Tor Troéng (born January 25, 1983) is a retired Swedish mixed martial artist previously fighting as a Middleweight for the Ultimate Fighting Championship. He was a member FX's The Ultimate Fighter: Team Jones vs. Team Sonnen.

Early life
Troéng started to train martials arts in his hometown of Umeå, Sweden at the age of 9, starting doing MMA when he was 16. Troéng went to Umeå University, where he earned a master's degree in Engineering Physics.

Mixed martial arts career

Early career
After going 6 amateur-fights 2001-2004, Troéng started doing MMA as a professional in 2005 mostly fighting in smaller promotions in Sweden and other parts of Europe. Since Troéng didn’t have a manager at the time, he accepted every fight that he was offered, even against opponents that was considered to be way above him in the ranks, which was leading to him being an underdog in a lot of his fights. Despite all this, by 2012 he had racked up a record of 15-4-1 (11-1-1 in his last 13 fights) with a victory over UFC veteran Mark Weir and fights against notable opponents like Mamed Khalidov, Lucio Linhares, former UFC title challenger Thales Leites and Pride veteran Daniel Acácio. Troéng is considered one of the best middleweight mixed martial artists to come out of Sweden and Scandinavia.

The Ultimate Fighter
In January 2013, it was announced that Troéng was selected for The Ultimate Fighter: Team Jones vs. Team Sonnen. To get into the TUF house, Troéng defeated Scott Rosa by submission (rear-naked choke).  During the choosing of teams, he was the fourth pick of Chael Sonnen for Team Sonnen and seventh overall. He faced Josh Samman in the preliminary round. He lost the fight by KO.

Ultimate Fighting Championship
Troéng made his UFC debut against castmate Adam Cella on April 6, 2013, at UFC on Fuel TV 9. He won the fight via submission due to a rear naked choke in the first round.

Troéng fought Rafael Natal on September 4, 2013,  at UFC Fight Night: Teixeira vs. Bader. Early in the second round Troeng was knocked down by a huge right hand followed up by some ground and pound from Natal, but was able to survive and recover from it. He lost by unanimous decision. The performance earned him Fight of the Night honors along with Natal.

Troéng was expected to face TUF 17 castmate Robert McDaniel on March 15, 2014, at UFC 171. But he was later forced to withdraw from the bout due to a shoulder injury and was replaced by Sean Strickland.

Troéng faced Trevor Smith on July 19, 2014, at UFC Fight Night 46. He lost the fight by unanimous decision.

Troéng faced Krzysztof Jotko on October 4, 2014, at UFC Fight Night: Nelson vs. Story. He lost the fight by unanimous decision.

After his loss to Jotko, Troéng retired from MMA competition.

Personal life
Troéng has a master's degree in Engineering physics and he is still working part-time doing research in mathematics, at the University of Umeå.

After retiring from his own fighting career, Troéng has since taken the role as a fight promoter. In doing so he has brought back the Swedish organisation Battle of Botnia, which he fought for himself in 2009 and 2011, and which had been inactive for about four years. The first event under the organisation's new promotion, and the fifth in total count, took place on November 28, 2015, at Battle of Botnia 2015, in Troéng's hometown of Umeå. The event was headlined by Troéng's former training partner, UFC veteran Niklas Bäckström, and the card did also feature up and coming fighters from Troéng's own gym, Renyi Fight Camp.

Championships and accomplishments

Mixed martial arts
Ultimate Fighting Championship
Fight of the Night (One time) vs Rafael Natal

Mixed martial arts record

|-
|Loss
|align=center| 16–7–1
|Krzysztof Jotko
|Decision (unanimous)
|UFC Fight Night: Nelson vs. Story
|
|align=center|3
|align=center|5:00
|Stockholm, Sweden
|
|-
|Loss
|align=center| 16–6–1 
|Trevor Smith
|Decision (unanimous)
|UFC Fight Night: McGregor vs. Brandao
|
|align=center|3
|align=center|5:00
|Dublin, Ireland
|
|-
|Loss
|align=center| 16–5–1
|Rafael Natal
|Decision (unanimous)
|UFC Fight Night: Teixeira vs. Bader
 |
|align=center|3
|align=center|5:00
|Belo Horizonte, Brazil
|
|-
|Win
|align=center| 16–4–1
|Adam Cella
|Submission (rear-naked choke)
|UFC on Fuel TV: Mousasi vs. Latifi
|
|align=center|1
|align=center|3:11
|Stockholm, Sweden
|
|-
|Win
|align=center| 15–4–1
|Mats Nilsson
|Decision (unanimous)
|The Zone FC 10
|
|align=center|3
|align=center|5:00
|Gothenburg, Sweden
|
|-
|Win
|align=center| 14–4–1
|Andre Reinders
|KO (punch)
|Gladiator Championship Fighting 7 - Redemption
|
|align=center|1
|align=center|3:17
|Prague, Czech Republic
|
|-
|Win
|align=center| 13–4–1
|Tomas Kuzela
|Submission (rear-naked choke)
|Battle of Botnia 4
|
|align=center|2
|align=center|4:05
|Umeå, Sweden
|
|-
|Win
|align=center| 12–4–1
|Robert Jocz
|Decision (unanimous)
|Superior Challenge 7
|
|align=center|3
|align=center|5:00
|Stockholm, Sweden
|
|-
|Loss
|align=center| 11–4–1
|Thales Leites
|Submission (rear-naked choke)
|Superior Challenge 6
|
|align=center|2
|align=center|3:33
|Stockholm, Sweden
|
|-
|Win
|align=center| 11–3–1
|Rafael Silva
|Submission (triangle choke) 
|Superior Challenge 5
|
|align=center|3
|align=center|2:44
|Stockholm, Sweden
|
|-
|Win
|align=center| 10–3–1
|Matt Thorpe
|Submission (kimura)
|Battle of Botnia 2
|
|align=center|1
|align=center|4:02
|Umeå, Sweden
|
|-
|Win
|align=center| 9–3–1
|Mark Weir
|Submission (triangle choke)
|Superior Challenge 4
|
|align=center|3
|align=center|2:05
|Stockholm, Sweden
|
|-
|Win
|align=center| 8–3–1
|Bruno Silva
|TKO (punches)
|Battle of Botnia
|
|align=center|1
|align=center|1:24
|Umeå, Sweden
|
|-
|Draw
|align=center| 7–3–1
|Mikko Suvanto
|Draw
|FinnFight 10
|
|align=center|3
|align=center|5:00
|Turku, Finland
|
|-
|Win
|align=center| 7–3
|Nic Osei
|TKO (punches) 
|Rumble of The Kings
|
|align=center|2
|align=center|1.11
|Luleå, Sweden
|
|-
|Win
|align=center| 6–3
|Jacek Buczko
|Submission (rear-naked choke)
|Baltic Storm 3
|
|align=center|2
|align=center|2:10
|Gdańsk, Poland
|
|-
|Win
|align=center| 5–3
|Rodney Moore
|Decision (unanimous)
|Superior Challenge 1
|
|align=center|3
|align=center|5:00
|Stockholm, Sweden
|
|-
|Loss
|align=center| 4–3
|Daniel Acacio
|Decision
|Fight Festival 23
|
|align=center|3
|align=center|5:00
|Helsinki, Finland
|
|-
|Win
|align=center| 4–2
|Fatih Balci
|TKO (doctor stoppage)
|The Zone FC 1
|
|align=center|1
|align=center|2:19
|Stockholm, Sweden
|
|-
|Loss
|align=center| 3–2
|Lucio Linhares
|Decision (split)
|Shooto Finland – Chicago Collision 3
|
|align=center|2
|align=center|5:00
|Lahti, Finland
|
|-
|Loss
|align=center| 3–1
|Mamed Khalidov
|Submission (triangle choke)
|Full Contact Prestige 3 – Khalidov vs. Troeng
|
|align=center|1
|align=center|4:47
|Poznań, Poland
|
|-
|Win
|align=center| 3–0
|Fernando Soares
|TKO (strikes)
|European Vale Tudo 7 - Rebels
|
|align=center|1
|align=center|1:47
|Stockholm, Sweden
|
|-
|Win
|align=center| 2–0
|Matti Makela
|Decision (unanimous)
|Shooto Sweden - Tantogarden
|
|align=center|2
|align=center|5:00
|Stockholm, Sweden
|
|-
|Win
|align=center| 1–0
|Muhammed Misagi
|TKO (punches)
|Cage Challenge 1
|
|align=center|2
|align=center|2:10
|Gothenburg, Sweden
|
|-

References

External links
 
 
 Tor Troeng - UFC Fans

1983 births
Living people
Sportspeople from Umeå
Swedish male mixed martial artists
Middleweight mixed martial artists
Mixed martial artists utilizing Brazilian jiu-jitsu
Ultimate Fighting Championship male fighters
Swedish practitioners of Brazilian jiu-jitsu
Umeå University alumni
Academic staff of Umeå University